Drew Windle (born July 22, 1992) is an American middle-distance runner. He competed in the Men's 800 metres at the 2017 World Championships in Athletics.

He won his first global medal – an 800 m silver – as the quickest athlete over the last 200 m, moving from sixth to second place.

He grew up in New Albany, Ohio and attended New Albany High School before moving to Ashland University.

International competitions

References

External links
 
 
 
 2015 Drew Windle – Ashland official profile
 2018 Drew Windle – Brooks Beast profile
 Dear Younger Me: Drew Windle at milesplit
 

1992 births
Living people
People from New Albany, Ohio
Track and field athletes from Ohio
American male middle-distance runners
World Athletics Championships athletes for the United States
Ashland Eagles men's track and field athletes
People from Albany, Ohio